Livingston's bulldog Marcusenius livingstonii is a species of ray-finned fish in the family Mormyridae. It is found in Malawi, Mozambique, and Tanzania. Its natural habitats are rivers, intermittent rivers, and freshwater lakes. It is threatened by habitat loss.

Etymology
The fish is named in honor of the brother of explorer David Livingstone, Charles Livingstone (1821-1873), who collected the type specimen.

References

Marcusenius
Taxonomy articles created by Polbot
Taxa named by George Albert Boulenger
Fish described in 1898